Heikki Samuli Autto (born 23 August 1984 in Enontekiö) is a Finnish politician currently serving in the Parliament of Finland for the National Coalition Party at the Lapland constituency.

References

1984 births
Living people
People from Enontekiö
National Coalition Party politicians
Members of the Parliament of Finland (2011–15)
Members of the Parliament of Finland (2019–23)